Hospitality exchange services (HospEx) are social networking services used for accommodation of travellers, where hosts do not receive payments. The relationships on hospitality exchange services are shaped by altruism and are related to the cyber-utopianism on the Web in its beginnings and to utopia in general.

Uniqueness
Non-profit hospitality exchange services have offered scientists access to their anonymized data for publication of insights to the benefit of humanity. Before becoming for-profit, CouchSurfing offered four research teams access to its social networking data. In 2015, non-profit hospitality exchange services Bewelcome and Warm Showers also provided their data for public research.

The biggest HospEx platform in 2012, "CouchSurfing appears to fulfil the original utopian promise of the Internet to unite strangers across geographical and cultural divides and to form a global community" 
CouchSurfing used utopian rhetoric of "better world," "sharing cultures," and of much better access to global flows and networks of all sorts. It was featured as a means to achieve a cosmopolitan utopia. Commodification of CouchSurfing terminated "the existence of a project run as a flourishing commons, a cyber-utopian dream come true; an example of genuine exchange outside and free from the dominant logic of capital, a space highlighting cultural instead of monetary values, understanding instead of commerce. This space still exists, but  instead of outside, now within the market." After CouchSurfing became a for-profit corporation in 2011, some members urged others to join BeWelcome. Many brand ambassadors, who had become volunteers within CouchSurfing left to BeWelcome and other non-profit platforms because of the change in legal status and insufficient management transparency.

Notable hospitality exchange services

References